The Suzuki APV is a minivan/light commercial vehicle designed by Suzuki in Japan and manufactured in Indonesia by Suzuki Indomobil Motor. The abbreviation "APV" is short for All Purpose Vehicle. It is powered by either 1.5-liter or 1.6-liter inline-four G series engine delivering .

The pickup truck version is called Suzuki Mega Carry in Indonesia, Super Carry Pro in Vietnam and APV Pickup elsewhere. It was discontinued in February 2019 in favour of the international version of the Carry 1.5.

The APV is exported from Indonesia in April 2005 to more than 100 countries in Southeast Asia, Latin America, the Caribbean, Middle East, South Asia, North Africa and Oceania. Suzuki invested JP¥ 11.5 billion to produce a targeted 70,000 units per year in Indonesia.

Models

APV
The original APV was launched in September 2004, initially it was available in three trim levels: A, L and X. It is still currently available in three trim levels with standard equipment as Blind Van, GA and GE. The car is only offered with 5-speed manual transmission, live axle rear suspension with leaf springs, 14" steel wheels and black colored interior.

APV Arena
In November 2007, Suzuki released the facelifted version in Indonesia named APV Arena (APV Type II in some countries). It offers more luxurious features with the SGX trim as the top-of-the-line variant (available with captain seat version). Interior is also changed as well and an improvement in engine performance. Available in three trim levels: GL, GX and SGX. Available in either 5-speed manual or 4-speed automatic transmission, live axle rear suspension with 3-link suspension plus coil springs, 15" alloy wheels and beige coloured interior.

APV Arena Luxury
The Luxury variant of the APV Arena was launched in March 2009. It is based on the Arena SGX trim with several exterior makeover. It received a facelift in September 2014 with redesigned grille, bumpers and bigger 17" alloy wheels. Available in either 5-speed manual or 4-speed automatic transmission.

Mega Carry
The pickup truck version of the original APV was launched in April 2005 for international market. It became available for its home market in Indonesia in February 2011 as the Mega Carry and was marketed alongside the smaller Carry. The truck is offered in three variants: Standard short deck, Xtra long deck and special order Box model. It is only offered with 5-speed manual transmission. The Carry, Mega Carry, and Carry Futura sales were discontinued in February 2019 and replaced by Carry 1.5.

Mitsubishi Maven 
The APV was also sold by Mitsubishi Motors in Indonesia from 2005 until 2009 as the Mitsubishi Maven. It features minor exterior cosmetic changes, and was also built by Suzuki Indomobil Motor at their production plant.

The engine was supplied by Mitsubishi's Indonesian engine production partner, PT Mitsubishi Krama Yudha Motors and Manufacturing. The engine was also used in the Colt T120SS, which in turn is a rebadged Carry Futura.

Safety
From early 2017 onwards, the APV models in Indonesia were fitted with dual airbags. It is available as standard safety equipment in selected markets, but still lacks of ABS. For the Mega Carry version, it is only available with three-point seat belts.

References

External links

APV
Minivans
Vans
Pickup trucks
ANCAP business and family vans
Rear-wheel-drive vehicles
Cars introduced in 2004
2010s cars
2020s cars